The Devil's Rejects is a 2005 black comedy horror film written, produced and directed by Rob Zombie, and is the second film in the Firefly film series, serving as a sequel to his 2003 film House of 1000 Corpses. The film is centered on the run of three members of the psychopathic antagonist family from the previous film, now seen as villainous protagonists, with Sid Haig, Bill Moseley, and Zombie's wife Sheri Moon Zombie reprising their roles, and Leslie Easterbrook replacing Karen Black as the matriarch.

The Devil's Rejects was released on July 22, 2005, to minor commercial success, and mixed reviews, although it was generally considered an improvement over its predecessor. At the time of release and in the years since, the film has garnered a cult following. It was the final film to feature actor Matthew McGrory before his death the same year, although he did have an uncredited posthumous cameo in The Evil Within (2017), which was filmed in 2002. The film's DVD release is dedicated to his "loving memory."

Plot
On May 18, 1978, Texas Sheriff John Quincey Wydell and a large posse of state troopers issue a search and destroy mission on the Firefly family, who are responsible for over 75 homicides and disappearances over the past several years. The family arm themselves and fire on the officers. Rufus is killed and Mother Firefly is taken into custody while Otis and Baby escape. They steal a car, kill the driver, and go to Kahiki Palms, a run-down motel.

At the motel, Otis and Baby take a musical group called Banjo and Sullivan hostage in their room, and Otis shoots the roadie when he returns. Meanwhile, Baby's father, Captain Spaulding, decides to rendezvous with Baby and Otis. His truck runs out of gas on the way, and he frightens a boy and assaults the boy's mother before stealing her car. Back at the motel, Otis rapes Roy's wife Gloria and demands Adam and Roy come with him on an errand.

Otis drives his two prisoners to a place where he buried weapons. While walking to the location, the two prisoners attack Otis, but Otis bludgeons Roy and cuts Adam's face off. Back at the motel, Adam's wife Wendy tries to escape through the bathroom window. When Gloria attempts to rebel, Baby kills her. Wendy runs out of the motel but is caught by Captain Spaulding, who knocks her unconscious. Otis returns, and all three leave the motel together in the band's van.

The motel maid comes to clean the room, and she discovers the murder scene. The maid enters the bathroom where she sees "The Devil's Rejects" written on the wall in blood; she is startled by Wendy, who is accidentally killed when she runs out to the highway to seek help while she is in shock. Wydell calls a pair of amoral bounty hunters—the "Unholy Two"—Rondo and Billy Ray, to help him find the Fireflys. While investigating, they discover an associate of Spaulding's named Charlie Altamont. Wydell begins to lose his sanity when Mother Firefly reveals that she murdered his brother. After having a dream in which his brother commands him to avenge his death, Wydell stabs Mother Firefly to death. The surviving Fireflys gather at a brothel owned by Charlie, where he offers them shelter from the police.

After he leaves the brothel, Wydell threatens Charlie to give up the Fireflys. With the help of the "Unholy Two," the sheriff takes the family back to the Firefly house where he tortures them, using similar methods they used on their own victims. He nails Otis' hands to his chair and staples crime-scene photographs to Otis's and Baby's stomachs, then he beats and shocks Captain Spaulding and Otis with a cattle prod and taunts Baby about the death of her mother.

Wydell sets the house on fire and leaves Otis and Spaulding to burn, but he lets Baby loose outside so he can hunt her for sport. Charlie returns to save the Firefly family, but he is killed by Wydell. Baby gets shot in the calf of her left leg, brutally horse-whipped, and then strangled by Wydell. Tiny suddenly arrives and intervenes, breaking Wydell's neck and saving the Firefly family. Otis, Baby, and Spaulding escape in Charlie's 1972 Cadillac Eldorado and leave behind Tiny, who walks back into the burning house. The trio drives, badly injured. As Otis drives down the road with Baby and Spaulding asleep in the back seat, he notices a police barricade ahead of them. Realizing that they will not make it out alive, he wakes Baby and Spaulding and hands them each a gun. They speed toward the barricade, guns blazing as the police return fire, fading to black.

Cast

 Sid Haig as Captain Spaulding / "Cutter"
 Bill Moseley as Otis Driftwood
 Sheri Moon Zombie as Vera-Ellen "Baby" Firefly
 William Forsythe as Sheriff John Quincey Wydell
 Ken Foree as Charlie Altamont
 Matthew McGrory as Tiny Firefly
 Leslie Easterbrook as Mother Firefly
 Dave Sheridan as Officer Ray Dobson
 E. G. Daily as Candy
 Geoffrey Lewis as Roy Sullivan
 Priscilla Barnes as Gloria Sullivan
 Kate Norby as Wendy Banjo
 Lew Temple as Adam Banjo
 Danny Trejo as Rondo
 Diamond Dallas Page as Billy Ray Snapper
 Brian Posehn as Jimmy
 Ginger Lynn Allen as Fanny
 Tom Towles as George Wydell
 Michael Berryman as Clevon
 P. J. Soles as Susan
 Deborah Van Valkenburgh as Casey
 Jossara Jinaro as Maria
 Chris Ellis as Coggs
 Mary Woronov as Abbie
 Daniel Roebuck as Morris Green
 Duane Whitaker as Dr. Bankhead
 Tyler Mane as Rufus "RJ" Firefly, Jr.
 Jordan Orr as Jamie
 Robert Trebor as Marty Walker (uncredited)
 Kane Hodder as Gasmask Officer

Production

When Rob Zombie wrote House of 1000 Corpses (2003), he had a "vague idea for a story" about the brother of the sheriff that the Firefly clan killed coming back for revenge. After Lions Gate Entertainment made back all of their money on the first day of Corpses''' theatrical release, they wanted Zombie to make another film and he started to seriously think about a new story. With Rejects, Zombie has said that he wanted to make it "more horrific" and the characters less cartoonish than in Corpses, and that he wanted "to make something that was almost like a violent western. Sort of like a road movie." He has also cited films like Bonnie and Clyde (1967), The Wild Bunch (1969), Badlands (1973) and The Texas Chain Saw Massacre (1974) as influences on Rejects. When he approached William Forsythe about doing the film, he told the actor that the inspiration for how to portray his character came from actors like Lee Marvin and Robert Shaw. Sheri Moon Zombiedoes not see the film as a sequel: "It's more like some of the characters from House of 1000 Corpses came on over, and now they're the Devil's Rejects."

Zombie hired Phil Parmet, who had shot the documentary Harlan County, USA (1976), because he wanted to adopt a hand-held camera/documentary look. Principal photography was emotionally draining for some of the actors. Moon Zombie remembers a scene she had to do with Forsythe that required her to cry. The scene took two to three hours to film and affected her so much that she did not come into work for two days afterward.

The film went through the MPAA eight times earning an NC-17 rating every time until the last one. According to Zombie, the censors had a problem with the overall tone of the film. Specifically, censors did not like the motel scene between Bill Moseley and Priscilla Barnes, forcing Zombie to cut two minutes of it for the theatrical release. However, this footage was restored in the unrated DVD release.

Soundtrack

Zombie, who is also musician, decided to go with more southern rock to create the mood of the film. The film's soundtrack itself was notable as being one of the first to be released on DualDisc, with the DVD side featuring a making-of featurette for the film and a photo gallery.
In 2019, Zombie announced that Waxwork Records would release the soundtrack on vinyl along with the two other Zombie films in the trilogy, House of 1,000 Corpses and 3 from Hell (2019). The record included an essay written by director Rob Zombie and a 12x12" booklet that contained behind the scenes photographs.

Reception

Box officeThe Devil's Rejects was released by Lions Gate Films on July 22, 2005, in 1,757 theaters and grossed USD$7.1 million on its opening weekend, recouping its roughly $7 million budget. It grossed $17 million in North America and $2.3 million internationally for a total of $19.4 million.

Critical response
The film received mixed reviews from critics. On Rotten Tomatoes the film has an approval rating of 54% rating based on 138 reviews, with an average rating of 5.43/10. The site's consensus reads: "Zombie has improved as a filmmaker since House of 1000 Corpses and will please fans of the genre, but beware—the horror is nasty, relentless and sadistic". On Metacritic the film has a weighted average score of 53 out of 100 based on reviews from 32 critics, indicating "mixed or average reviews".

Critic Roger Ebert enjoyed the film and gave it three out of four stars. He wrote, "There is actually some good writing and acting going on here, if you can step back from the [violent] material enough to see it". Later, in his 2006 review for the horror film The Hills Have Eyes, Ebert referenced The Devil's Rejects, writing, "I received some appalled feedback when I praised Rob Zombie's The Devil's Rejects, but I admired two things about it [that were absent from The Hills Have Eyes]: (1) It desired to entertain and not merely to sicken, and (2) its depraved killers were individuals with personalities, histories and motives". In his review for Rolling Stone, Peter Travers gave The Devil's Rejects three out of four stars and wrote, "Let's hear it for the Southern-fried soundtrack, from Buck Owens' 'Satan's Got to Get Along Without Me' to Lynyrd Skynyrd's 'Free Bird', playing over the blood-soaked finale, which manages to wed The Wild Bunch to Thelma & Louise". Richard Roeper gave the film "thumbs up" for being successful at its goal to be the "sickest, the most twisted, the most deranged movie" at that point of the year (2005).

In her review for The New York Times, Dana Stevens wrote that the film "is a trompe-l'œil experiment in deliberately retro film-making. It looks sensational, but there is a curious emptiness at its core". Entertainment Weekly gave the film a "C+" rating and wrote, "Zombie's characters are, to put it mildly, undeveloped". Robert K. Elder, of the Chicago Tribune, disliked the film, writing "[D]espite decades of soaking in bloody classics such as the original Texas Chainsaw Massacre and I Spit on Your Grave, Zombie didn't absorb any of the underlying social tension or heart in those films. He's no collage artist of influences, like Quentin Tarantino, crafting his movie from childhood influences. Rejects plays more like a junkyard of homages, strewn together and lost among inept cops, gaping plot holes and buzzard-ready dialog".

Horror author Stephen King rated The Devil's Rejects the 9th best film of 2005 and wrote, "No redeeming social merit, perfect '70s C-grade picture cheesy glow; this must be what Quentin Tarantino meant when he did those silly Kill Bill pictures".

James Berardinelli was very negative giving The Devil's Rejects half a star (out of a possible four stars) and called it a "vile, reprehensible movie," saying the action was "more formula than plot." He described the dialogue as "a pastiche (at least I think that's the intention) of the kind of bloodthirsty, overripe lines found" in a genre of films from the 1970s about "outcasts who defy society by destroying it." He was extremely critical of the acting, directing, and the production values, with an ending that was "a cataclysmic misfire", and overall was not "engaging cinema."

Awards

Sequel

In January 2018, it was rumoured that a sequel, 3 from Hell, was in production. Rob Zombie confirmed this via Instagram in March 2018, sharing a photo from the director's seat. A teaser trailer for 3 from Hell'' was released in June 2019, and the film opened in September 16, 2019.

Notes

References

External links

 
 
 
 

2000s American films
2000s German films
2005 horror films
2005 films
2000s comedy horror films
2000s road movies
2000s serial killer films
American splatter films
American independent films
American black comedy films
American road movies
American sequel films
American serial killer films
German splatter films
English-language German films
2000s Spanish-language films
Films directed by Rob Zombie
Films set in Texas
Films set in 1978
Films shot in California
Films shot in Los Angeles
German horror films
German independent films
German sequel films
Lionsgate films
Films scored by Tyler Bates
Films with screenplays by Rob Zombie
Firefly (film series)
Films produced by Rob Zombie